KBKF-LD, virtual and VHF digital channel 6, is a low-powered television station (LPTV) licensed to San Jose, California, United States. The station is owned by Venture Technologies Group, LLC. Its transmitter site is located on Loma Prieta Peak.

Although licensed as a TV station, KBKF-LD primarily functions as a radio station, broadcasting Contemporary Christian music from the Air1 network that can be heard by FM radios at 87.7 MHz. Its ATSC 3.0 video feed broadcasts U Channel on digital channel 6.2.

History

Originally KBKF-LP, the station initially transmitted as an analog TV station, taking advantage of the fact that the analog TV standard for channel 6 specifies the audio portion of the transmission as an FM signal centered on 87.75 MHz. This can be picked up by most FM receivers at 87.7 FM.

Faced with an approaching July 13, 2021 FCC deadline requiring all LPTV stations to convert from analog to digital transmissions, Venture Technologies developed a version of the ATSC 3.0 digital TV standard that allows an analog FM audio subcarrier to coexist with the digital TV signal.

Now operating as a digital LPTV station with the call sign KBKF-LD, this station was used as a test site, and began dual digital TV/analog FM transmissions in February 2021. On June 10, 2021, the FCC issued a six month long Special Temporary Authority (STA) grant allowing KBKF-LD to continue analog FM broadcasts on 87.75 MHz using this method.

See also
 KSCZ-LD

References

External links
Air1 Website
Venture Technologies Group website

Air1 radio stations
Television channels and stations established in 2004
BKF-LP
Television in San Jose, California
BFK-LP
Low-power television stations in the United States
ATSC 3.0 television stations